Reigen (German 'Round Dance') is a German-language opera in ten scenes by Philippe Boesmans to a libretto by Luc Bondy after Arthur Schnitzler's play La Ronde (1897). The opera was premiered at La Monnaie, Brussels in 1993.

Scenes
The Whore and the Soldier
The Soldier and the Parlor Maid
The Parlor Maid and the Young Gentleman
The Young Gentleman and the Young Wife
The Young Wife and The Husband
The Husband and the Little Miss
The Little Miss and the Poet
The Poet and the Actress
The Actress and the Count
The Count and the Whore

Roles
Die Dirne, Leocadia (soprano)
Der Soldat, Franz (tenor)
Das Stubenmädchen, Mizzi (mezzosoprano)
Der junge Herr, Alfred (tenor)
Die junge Frau, Emma (soprano)
Der Gatte, Gottfried (baritone)
Das süße Mädel (mezzosoprano)
Der Dichter, Robert (tenor)
Die Sängerin (soprano)
Der Graf (baritone)

Recordings
1994 – Deborah Raymond (Die Dirne), Mark Curtis (Der Soldat), Elzbieta Ardam (Das Stubenmädchen), Roberto Saccà (Der junge Herr), Solveig Kringelborn (Die junge Frau), Franz-Ferdinand Nentwig (Der Gatte), Randi Stene (Das süße Mädel), Ronald Hamilton (Der Dichter), Françoise Pollet (Die Sängerin), Dale Duesing (Der Graf). Ricercar 133122/123, Orchestre Symphonique de la Monnaie, Sylvain Cambreling  reissued digitally Cypres.

References

1993 operas
Operas by Philippe Boesmans
Operas
Operas based on plays
German-language operas
Opera world premieres at La Monnaie